Marco Marin (born 4 July 1963) is an Italian politician, dentist and fencer. He won a gold, two silvers and a bronze in sabre events at three Olympic Games between 1984 and 1992. He served as a Senator between 2013 and 2018, before joining the Chamber of Deputies in 2018.

References

External links
 

1963 births
Living people
Italian male fencers
Olympic fencers of Italy
Fencers at the 1984 Summer Olympics
Fencers at the 1988 Summer Olympics
Fencers at the 1992 Summer Olympics
Olympic gold medalists for Italy
Olympic silver medalists for Italy
Olympic bronze medalists for Italy
Olympic medalists in fencing
Sportspeople from Padua
Medalists at the 1984 Summer Olympics
Medalists at the 1988 Summer Olympics
Medalists at the 1992 Summer Olympics
Universiade medalists in fencing
Universiade gold medalists for Italy
Medalists at the 1983 Summer Universiade
Forza Italia (2013) politicians
Senators of Legislature XVII of Italy
Deputies of Legislature XVIII of Italy